SportsBeat is two minutes of programming, where Dari Nowkhah gives his take on the days sports world. SportsBeat is heard Monday through to Friday in the afternoons at the bottom of the hour on ESPN Radio. It happens in the :57-:00 minutes of the hour, with Dari Nowkhah's opinions, and a commercial break in the :58 minute between the two talking points. It features an insightful capsule of the major breaking news of the day and a preview of the night ahead. It is heard on over 472 plus affiliates across the United States and Canada.

On January 1, 2004, Tirico assumed the role as voice of ESPN Radio's weekday afternoon drivetime SportsBeat segments, the five-minute daily mainstay of the network since Brent Musburger launched ESPN Radio with the inaugural SportsBeat on January 1, 1992. Tirico is one of the most respected play-by-play men in the country as he has experience as the lead play-by-play man of ESPN's Monday Night Football and also calls NBA games for the network as well as formally served as an anchor on ESPN's signature show SportsCenter. After Mike Tirico left ESPN in 2016, Dari Nowkhah, who filled in for Mike Tirico on SportsBeat in the past, became the permanent host of the ESPN Radio SportsBeat.

Television series
SportsBeat (or ABC SportsBeat, its official title) was previously a television series that was hosted by Howard Cosell on ABC. SportsBeat, which ran from 1983–1985, won three Emmy Awards. ABC SportsBeat was a precursor of sorts to sports magazine shows like ESPN's Outside the Lines and HBO's Real Sports with Bryant Gumbel. SportsBeat likewise featured penetrating, in-depth interviews.

References

External links
ESPN Show page
ESPN Radio

American sports radio programs
ESPN Radio programs
American Broadcasting Company original programming
1983 American television series debuts
1985 American television series endings
ABC Sports
1980s American television news shows